Imray is a surname which may refer to:

Colin Imray (1909–1998), British colonial policeman involved in the 1948 Accra riots
Sir Colin Imray (diplomat) (1933–2020), British High Commissioner to Tanzania and Bangladesh
John Imray (1811–1880), Dominican physician, legislator, agriculturist and botanist
John Imray (patent attorney) (1820–1902), Scottish engineer and patent agent